Seun is a unisex Nigerian name that means Thanks. The full form is usually Oluwaseun which means Thank God.

Given name
Seun Adigun (born 1987), Nigerian runner
Seun Kuti, Nigerian musician
Seun Omojola, Nigerian singer, songwriter and actress
Seun Osewa, Nigerian internet entrepreneur
Seun Ogunkoya (born 1977), Nigerian sprinter 

Surname
Abayomi Owonikoko Seun (born 1992), Nigerian-Georgian football player
Olulayo Seun (born 1996), Nigerian football player

See also
Seun Sangga a shopping area in Seoul, South Korea